Caesar's is a restaurant on Avenida Revolución in Tijuana, Mexico, famous as the home of the Caesar salad. Restaurateur Caesar Cardini, an Italian immigrant, opened the restaurant in 1923, and it is now under chef Javier Plascencia, leading chef of Baja Med cuisine.

History
The original Caesar's bar and restaurant was first opened in an alley in 1923, and its salad became famous after its reported invention on July 4 of the following year. Julia Child said that she visited the restaurant during her youth in 1925 or 1926. In 1926 it moved to 2nd Street, and a year later it moved to its current location at the Hotel Caesar's on Avenida Revolución Street between 4th and 5th streets. Cardini bought the hotel and restaurant in 1932.

Following a huge reduction in U.S. visitors to Tijuana after 9/11 and subsequent long border wait times to return to the U.S., the restaurant closed in 2009, due to debt. Javier's father Juan José Plascencia renovated the restaurant and reopened it in July, 2010, with a luxurious art deco interior reminiscent of the 1920s. In 2017, the San Diego Reader called it the "classiest joint in Tijuana". Waiters prepare the "original" Caesar salads tableside.

The restaurant and hotel were featured by Andrew Zimmern in his Travel Channel television special The Border Check.

References

External links
 Caesar's - Grupo Plascencia
 Caesar's - Grupo Plascencia 

Restaurants in Mexico
Tijuana